Universe is a monthly peer-reviewed open access scientific journal published by MDPI covering several aspects of physics and astronomy and astrophysics. It was established in 2015. The editor-in-chief is Lorenzo Iorio since its inception.

Abstracting and indexing
The journal is abstracted and indexed in the Science Citation Index Expanded and Scopus. According to the Journal Citation Reports, the journal has a 2021 impact factor of 2.813.

Young investigator award
Since 2020, the journal confers the Universe Young Investigator Award to a young researcher in recognition of their excellence in fields related to fundamental principles and discovered in the universe. The first awardee (2020) was Lavinia Heisenberg (ETH Zürich, Switzerland).

References

External links

MDPI academic journals
Monthly journals
Publications established in 2015
Open access journals
English-language journals
Physics journals